Andrzej Gonera (born 18 February 1939) is a Polish gymnast. He competed in eight events at the 1968 Summer Olympics.

References

1939 births
Living people
Polish male artistic gymnasts
Olympic gymnasts of Poland
Gymnasts at the 1968 Summer Olympics
Sportspeople from Toruń